Selma is an unincorporated community in Madison Township, Clark County, Ohio, USA.

History
Selma was platted in 1842 when the Xenia and Columbus Pike was extended to that point. A post office called Selma was established in 1841, and remained in operation until 1967. Selma was a station on the Underground Railroad.

References

Unincorporated communities in Clark County, Ohio
1842 establishments in Ohio
Populated places established in 1842
Unincorporated communities in Ohio